John Best (11 July 1940 – 5 October 2014) was an American international soccer defender. He spent six seasons in the North American Soccer League where he was a five-time first team All Star. He later coached the NASL Seattle Sounders and served as the general manager of the Sounders and the Vancouver Whitecaps. He also earned one cap with the U.S. national team in 1973.

Playing
Best began his career in England. He played for Liverpool in 1959 under the new manager, Bill Shankly, after which he played seven games with Tranmere Rovers in 1960. In 1967, he moved to the United States where he signed with the Philadelphia Spartans of the National Professional Soccer League (NPSL). In 1968, the NPSL merged with the United Soccer Association to form the North American Soccer League. When the Spartans folded, Best and several of his teammates, transferred to the Cleveland Stokers for the 1969 NASL season. When the Stokers folded at the end of the season, he moved to the Dallas Tornado (NASL). From 1969 to 1973, he played in ninety-three games and was a five-time first team All Star. In 1971, the Tornado won the NASL championship. Best retired at the end of the 1973 season. Best also returned briefly to England in 1968 to play for Fleetwood in the Northern Premier League.

National team
Best earned his one cap with the U.S. national team in a 17 March 1963 game with Bermuda. Best began the game, a 4–0 loss, and came off for Johnny Moore.

Coaching
In 1974, the NASL expansion team Seattle Sounders began assembling its staff and roster. The owners hired Cliff McCrath, the head coach of the local Seattle Pacific University to fill in the team's roster spots. He hired Best as the team's first head coach. Over his three years as coach, Best compiled a 43–26 record.

General manager
After leaving the Sounders, Best moved north to become the general manager of the Vancouver Whitecaps. One of his most successful personnel moves was hiring Tony Waiters as head coach. This move and several others led to the Whitecaps winning the 1979 NASL championship. In 1982, the Sounders opened their season 2–7. The team ownership turned to Best who became the Sounders' general manager on 14 June 1982. The Sounders turned their season around and went to the championship game, only to lose to the New York Cosmos. Despite this success, the team was losing money after its sale to new ownership in January 1983, Best left the team.

Later years
Best remained in the Seattle area, founding Tacoma Indoor Soccer, Inc, which became the ownership group for the Tacoma Stars of the Major Indoor Soccer League (MISL). He was later inducted into the Tacoma-Pierce County Sports Hall of Fame.

In 1990, Best was diagnosed with kidney disease and in 2002 received a kidney transplant from his wife, Claudia.

Death
On 5 October 2014, Best died from a lung infection at the age of 74 while visiting family in Ireland.

Honors
NASL Championships: 
1971, 1973 (runner-up), 1971 indoor
NASL First Team All Star: 
1969, 1970, 1971, 1972, 1973

References

External links
 John Best NASL stats

1940 births
2014 deaths
American soccer players
English footballers
Tranmere Rovers F.C. players
Fleetwood Town F.C. players
English emigrants to the United States
United States men's international soccer players
National Professional Soccer League (1967) players
Philadelphia Spartans players
Philadelphia Ukrainian Nationals players
North American Soccer League (1968–1984) players
North American Soccer League (1968–1984) indoor players
Cleveland Stokers players
Dallas Tornado players
American soccer coaches
North American Soccer League (1968–1984) coaches
Seattle Sounders (1974–1983) coaches
Liverpool F.C. players
Stockport County F.C. players
California Jaguars players
Seattle Sounders (1974–1983) players
Association football defenders
English expatriate sportspeople in the United States
Expatriate soccer players in the United States
English expatriate footballers
Major Indoor Soccer League (1978–1992) commentators